Silas Sammis House is a historic home located at Huntington in Suffolk County, New York. It consists of a -story, five-bay, shingled section built about 1730 and a larger, three-bay, -story shingled residence built about 1800.  The small east wing was the original dwelling.  It is an intact example of settlement period architecture in Huntington.

It was added to the National Register of Historic Places in 1985.

References

External links

Houses on the National Register of Historic Places in New York (state)
Historic American Buildings Survey in New York (state)
Houses completed in 1730
Houses in Suffolk County, New York
National Register of Historic Places in Suffolk County, New York